Qeshlaq-e Aqa Esmail (also Romanized as Qeshlāq-e Āqā Esmāʿīl) is a village in Howmeh Rural District, in the Central District of Garmsar County, Semnan Province, Iran. At the 2006 census, its population was 17, in 6 families.

References 

Populated places in Garmsar County